Thaumatosia is a monotypic genus of brachiopod belonging to the family Thaumatosiidae. The only species is Thaumatosia anomala.

The species is found in Indian Ocean.

References

Terebratulida
Brachiopod genera
Monotypic brachiopod genera